A Blackmailer's Trick is a 1921 German silent mystery film directed by Erich Schönfelder and starring Ferdinand von Alten, Willi Schaeffers and Loni Nest. It features the popular detective hero Joe Deebs.

Cast
Ferdinand von Alten as Joe Deebs, detective
Willi Schaeffers as Bob Osborn
Loni Nest as Alice Osborn
Erich Schönfelder as Cowter
Bruno Kretschmer as policeman
Georg Schmidt-Rudow as shyster lawyer
Jaro Fürth

References

External links

Films of the Weimar Republic
Films directed by Erich Schönfelder
German silent feature films
UFA GmbH films
German mystery films
German black-and-white films
1921 mystery films
Silent mystery films
1920s German films